William Darcy McKeough,  (born January 31, 1933) is a former politician in Ontario, Canada. He was a Progressive Conservative member of the Legislative Assembly of Ontario from 1963 to 1978 who represented the ridings of Kent West and Chatham—Kent. He was a cabinet minister in the governments of John Robarts and Bill Davis. Due to McKeough's senior position in cabinet as Treasurer, Minister of Economics and Intergovernmental Affairs and Minister of Municipal Affairs, he was often referred to as the 'Duke of Kent'.

After he retired from politics in 1978, he spent a further career in business administering to his companies McKeough Investments and McKeough Supply. He also spent time as a member of the board of Hydro One and was CEO of Union Gas.

Background
Born in Chatham, Ontario and educated at Ridley College in St. Catharines, Canada. After which received a Bachelor of Arts degree from the University of Western Ontario in 1954.

Politics
From 1960 to 1961 and 1962 to 1963, he was a member of the Chatham City Council.

In the 1963 provincial election, McKeough ran as the Progressive Conservative candidate in the southwestern Ontario riding of Kent West. He defeated Liberal candidate G.R. Newkirk by 1,739 votes. In 1967, he ran in the new riding of Chatham—Kent and defeated Liberal Tom Henry by 1,291 votes. He was re-elected in 1971, 1975 and 1977.

In 1966 he was appointed to cabinet as a Minister without portfolio by Premier John Robarts. In 1967 he was promoted to Minister of Municipal Affairs after the previous minister, Wilf Spooner was defeated in the 1967 election. Among other things, he introduced legislation to create the city of Thunder Bay in Northern Ontario by an amalgamation of existing municipalities.

In 1971, he entered the leadership race to replace Robarts who retired in December 1970. He was viewed as a compromise candidate between front runner Bill Davis and contender Allan Lawrence. He placed third in the contest which was won by Davis. After McKeough dropped out he endorsed Davis which was seen as a key move in Davis's narrow victory. In return, Davis appointed McKeough to the senior cabinet post of Treasurer of Ontario and Minister of Economics.

In September 1972, McKeough resigned from cabinet when it was revealed in a story by The Globe and Mail that he was involved in a conflict of interest when, as Minister of Municipal Affairs, his ministry had approved a housing development in which he was financially involved. In his resignation announcement, McKeough claimed he had done nothing wrong but felt that he could no longer continue in his position when is credibility would be continually questioned.

In 1973 he was returned to cabinet as Minister of Energy. In January 1975, he was restored to the posts of Treasurer and Minister of Economics and Intergovernmental Affairs. In August 1978 he retired from politics.

Cabinet posts

Later life
After leaving political office in 1978 he returned to the private sector and has had a number of positions, particularly in the energy sector. In 1994, he was made an Officer of the Order of Canada for his "successful business ventures and fund-raising efforts on behalf of educational, medical, research and cultural institutions".

References

External links
 

1933 births
Businesspeople from Ontario
Living people
Finance ministers of Ontario
Officers of the Order of Canada
People from Chatham-Kent
Progressive Conservative Party of Ontario MPPs
Ridley College alumni
University of Western Ontario alumni